The following is a list of Ball State Cardinals football seasons for the football team that has represented Ball State University in NCAA competition.

Seasons

References

Ball State

Ball State Cardinals football seasons